Christine Gossé (born 26 October 1964 in Offenburg, Germany) is a French rower.

References 
 
 

1964 births
Living people
French female rowers
People from Offenburg
Sportspeople from Freiburg (region)
Rowers at the 1984 Summer Olympics
Rowers at the 1988 Summer Olympics
Rowers at the 1992 Summer Olympics
Rowers at the 1996 Summer Olympics
Olympic bronze medalists for France
Olympic rowers of France
Rowing coaches
World Rowing Championships medalists for France
Medalists at the 1996 Summer Olympics
21st-century French women
20th-century French women